Merlänna is a locality situated in Strängnäs Municipality, Södermanland County, Sweden with 356 inhabitants in 2010.

References 

Populated places in Södermanland County
Populated places in Strängnäs Municipality